Cosine is an unincorporated community in the Rural Municipality of Heart's Hill No. 352, Saskatchewan, Canada. It is located about 5 kilometres from the Alberta-Saskatchewan border.

See also
 St. Joseph's Colony
 List of communities in Saskatchewan

Ghost towns in Saskatchewan
Unincorporated communities in Saskatchewan
Heart's Hill No. 352, Saskatchewan
Division No. 13, Saskatchewan